Bolshoy Moskvoretsky Bridge is a concrete arch bridge that spans the Moskva River in Moscow, Russia, immediately east of the Kremlin. The bridge connects Red Square with Bolshaya Ordynka Street in Zamoskvorechye. Built in 1936–1937, it was designed by V. S. Kirillov (structural engineering) and Alexey Shchusev (architectural design).

Moskvoretsky bridge (1829/1872, demolished)
Wooden bridges east of the Kremlin have existed since the fifteenth century, as witnessed by Venetian Ambrogio Contarini, who travelled through Moscow in 1476.

It was loosely based on Kamennoostrovsky Bridge in Saint Petersburg designed by Agustín de Betancourt. The bridge burned down in 1871; after the fire, steel arches and decking were installed on the old abutments.

Bolshoy Moskvoretsky bridge (1937)

In 1935–1938, all the bridges in town centre Moscow were replaced with high capacity ones. Moskvoretsky Bridge was the first to be completed, and was the only concrete bridge of the 1930s. The bridge was placed at the narrowest point of the Moskva River, west of its predecessor; as a result, blocks of Zaryadye and Balchug were razed to make way for construction.

Although it is a concrete structure, Alexey Shchusev finished the bridge in pink granite slabs to create the illusion that the bridge is actually built in stone.

On 27 May 1987 German aviator Mathias Rust landed on the bridge.

On 27 February 2015 opposition politician Boris Nemtsov was shot to death while crossing this bridge.

Bibliography

References

See also
List of bridges in Moscow

Bridges in Moscow
Deck arch bridges
Bridges completed in 1829
Bridges completed in 1937
Concrete bridges
Cultural heritage monuments of regional significance in Moscow